Hemang Lower Denkyirais one of the constituencies represented in the Parliament of Ghana. It elects one Member of Parliament (MP) by the first past the post system of election. The Hemang Lower Denkyira constituency is located in the Twifo/Heman/Lower Denkyira district of the Central Region of Ghana.

Boundaries
The seat is located entirely within the Twifo/Heman/Lower Denkyira district of the Central Region of Ghana.

History 
The constituency was first created in 2004 by the Electoral Commission of Ghana along with 29 other new ones, increasing the number of constituencies from 200 to 230.

Members of Parliament

Elections
Benjamin  Bimpong Donkor, the current MP for the Assin South constituency was first elected in the constituency's first ever election in 2004. He retained his seat by a majority of 476 (2.4%) in the  2008 parliamenary election.

See also
List of Ghana Parliament constituencies
Twifo/Heman/Lower Denkyira District

References 

Parliamentary constituencies in the Central Region (Ghana)